John Rosso is a Papua New Guinea politician and Member of the 10th Parliament of Papua New Guinea. He is also a businessman, and owns two companies based in Lae. Elected as an independent, he joined the Pangu Party shortly after the election. He is currently Minister for Lands and Physical Planning in the Marape-Steven Government.

Career
Rosso has been active in private enterprise and is the owner of FTM Construction and ESS Security Services. He was once employed as a bouncer at the Club 69 nightclub in Lae run by Madang Open MP Bryan Jared Kramer.

Rosso was first elected to the Lae Open seat in the 2017 General Elections as an independent candidate. He subsequently joined Pangu Party (Pangu Pati). He was appointed Minister for Lands & Physical Planning in the government of James Marape and was sworn in to office on 7 June 2019.

References 

Living people
Pangu Party politicians
Deputy Prime Ministers of Papua New Guinea
Government ministers of Papua New Guinea
Members of the National Parliament of Papua New Guinea
Year of birth missing (living people)